Housain Ali Al-Mogahwi (born 24 March 1988) is a Saudi Arabian professional footballer who plays as a midfielder for Al-Fateh and the Saudi Arabia national team.

Club career
He joined Al Fateh in 2010. Impressive performances made him a regular starter in the Saudi club.

International career
He made his debut for Saudi Arabia against Iran in a 0–0 draw.

In May 2018 he was named in Saudi Arabia’s preliminary squad for the 2018 FIFA World Cup in Russia.

Career statistics

Club

International
Statistics accurate as of match played 17 November 2020.

International goals

Score and Result list Saudi Arabia's goal tally first

Honours
Al-Fateh
Saudi Pro League: 2012–13
Saudi Super Cup: 2013

Al-Ahli
Saudi Pro League: 2015–16
King Cup: 2016
Crown Prince Cup: 2014–15
Saudi Super Cup: 2016

Personal life

He is a Shia Muslim from Al-Hasa. Hossain lost his younger brother in 2015 after a short battle with an abdominal illness. he has stated that he is a fan of Barcelona FC and his ideal is Leonel Messi.

References

1988 births
Living people
People from Al-Hasa
Saudi Arabian footballers
Association football midfielders
Al-Adalah FC players
Al-Fateh SC players
Al-Ahli Saudi FC players
Saudi Second Division players
Saudi First Division League players
Saudi Professional League players
Saudi Arabia international footballers
2018 FIFA World Cup players
2019 AFC Asian Cup players
Saudi Arabian Shia Muslims